The Visit Knoxville Open is a golf tournament on the Korn Ferry Tour. It is played annually at the Holston Hills Country Club in Knoxville, Tennessee, U.S. It is one of four original Tour events still played. The Knoxville News Sentinel was the title sponsor of the tournament from 2000 to 2017, before Visit Knoxville took over as title sponsor in August 2019.

The 2021 purse was $600,000, with $108,000 going to the winner.

Winners

Bolded golfers graduated to the PGA Tour via the Korn Ferry Tour regular-season money list.

References

External links

Coverage on the Korn Ferry Tour's official site

Korn Ferry Tour events
Golf in Tennessee
Sports in Knoxville, Tennessee
Recurring sporting events established in 1990
1990 establishments in Tennessee